Ivanildo Rozenblad (16 May 1996 – 12 May 2021) was a Surinamese footballer who played as a forward for S.V. Robinhood and the Suriname national team.

Career
Playing for S.V. Robinhood, he scored 20 league goals in the 2016–17 season and 22 goals in 2017–18. The latter season he helped win the double, having also been cup champion in 2016.

Rozenblad came to prominence during the 2016 match against Guyana. The game was deadlocked 1–1. During the 30 minutes extra time, Rozenblad managed to secure a decisive victory.

Death
The career of Rozenblad started promising. Henk Fraser, trainer of Sparta Rotterdam, disclosed in an interview that Rozenblad was one of the two players he wanted to see in action during his visit to Suriname. Rozenblad had to stop playing football due to heart disease. On 12 May 2021, it was confirmed that he had died while playing football in Coronie. The cause of death has not yet been disclosed.

Career statistics
Scores and results list Suriname's goal tally first, score column indicates score after each Rozenblad goal.

References

External links
Caribbean Football Database profile

1996 births
2021 deaths
Surinamese footballers
Suriname international footballers
Association football forwards
S.V. Robinhood players
Sportspeople from Paramaribo